State Road 80 (SR 80) (also known as Palm Beach Boulevard in Lee County and Southern Boulevard in Palm Beach County) is a  route linking US 41 Business in Fort Myers and State Road A1A in Palm Beach.  The road is the northernmost of three linking Southwest Florida to South Florida via the Everglades (Alligator Alley and Tamiami Trail being the other two).  Due to increasing traffic, State Road 80 has experienced upgrades and widening in various sections since 2000.

Route description

Lee and Hendry Counties
State Road 80 begins at an intersection with US 41 (Tamiami Trail) in downtown Fort Myers.  From the terminus, it runs briefly along Main Street northeast to Monroe Street in the historic downtown of Fort Myers.  This segment of SR 80 terminates at Monroe Street and the route becomes discontinuous.  Historically, SR 80 continued east through downtown but that segment has since been turned over to city control.

State Road 80 resumes at Allen Street (just east of Seaboard Street) on the east side of Fort Myers.  From here, it is known as Palm Beach Boulevard, a four-lane divided highway that parallels the Caloosahatchee River.  It follows the river east out of the city, expanding to six lanes east of the Ortiz Avenue (CR 865) intersection in Tice.  It has an interchange with Interstate 75 as it passes through the eastern suburbs of Fort Myers before being reduced to four lanes east of SR 31 before leaving Lee County and entering Hendry County.  At its county seat, LaBelle, it serves as the town's main street and intersects SR 29.  After LaBelle, it continues east until an interchange with US 27, where the two roads run concurrently as a four-lane highway as it heads east towards Clewiston and the southern coast of Lake Okeechobee.

Palm Beach County

In Palm Beach County, it serves as a commuter route between South Bay and Belle Glade at the western end, growing suburbs Loxahatchee, Wellington, Royal Palm Beach and county seat West Palm Beach.  In South Bay, US 27 heads south towards Miami, following the North New River Canal.  Between Belle Glade and Loxahatchee, the roads are surrounded by sugarcane fields, with US 441 and US 98 both joining State Road 80 during this stretch. Lion Country Safari marks the beginning of a rural to urban transition of the road for the remainder of its journey.  The road doubles from four to eight lanes in Royal Palm Beach, as the road serves as the border between Royal Palm Beach and Wellington.  At the State Road 7 intersection, US 441 turns south towards Miami.  The South Florida Fairgrounds and the Coral Sky Amphitheater, where the South Florida Fair takes place, are next on the route, just east of SR 7.  After passing Florida's Turnpike, it gains two more lanes and becomes an expressway, with diamond interchanges with Jog Road, Haverhill Road and Military Trail.  East of Military Trail, it loses a lane in each direction as it straddles the southern end of Palm Beach International Airport, where private aircraft are serviced, with commercial access to the airport available via SR 704A.  It then approaches a bridge over the Tri-Rail main line as it intersects Interstate 95 at Exit 68, then becomes a four-lane road in several older, high-density neighborhoods in West Palm Beach.  East of the Florida East Coast Railway bridge crossing, it intersects US 1 and SR 5, reducing to two lanes as it crosses Lake Worth Lagoon on two bridges, and ending on a roundabout with SR A1A in Palm Beach near the Mar-a-Lago estate.

History

The route of State Road 80 was largely built in the 1920s.  The first vehicle to travel the route from Belle Glade to Palm Beach was in 1923.  The section from Twenty Mile Bend to West Palm Beach was considered part of the Conners Highway, which opened on July 4, 1924.  Segments west of Lake Okeechobee would be completed by 1926.

The route was first designated State Road 25 in 1923, running from Palm Beach to Punta Rassa.  As a result of the 1945 Florida State Road renumbering, the route became State Road 80 from Fort Myers to Palm Beach, and the segment west of Fort Myers to Punta Rassa became State Road 867.  (Ironically, State Road 25 still applies today to the concurrency with US 27 as that is now US 27’s hidden designation).

The segment between Belle Glade and Twenty Mile Bend, designated as the Kenneth C. Mock Memorial Highway was completed in 1989, making SR 80 a four-lane divided highway between Belle Glade and West Palm Beach. Prior to this, SR 80 (and US 441) ran just to the south along what is now County Road 880.  US 98, which previously ran along SR 700 (Conners Highway), would later be rerouted onto this route beginning around 2000.

Until 2002, Palm Beach County's Southern Boulevard was a four-lane road with a center left-turn lane, causing high gridlock due to the rapidly growing western suburbs of Loxahatchee, Royal Palm Beach and Wellington.  The road was known as "Killer 80" due to its high fatality rate.  In 2002, after many years of debate, the Florida Department of Transportation embarked on a $78 million project to upgrade and widen Southern Boulevard from I-95 to US 441/SR 7.   Between 2003 and 2008, it was transformed into a limited-access highway with freeway-grade diamond interchanges at the most congested intersections, with traffic signals remaining at others.

In Hendry County, a project to improve the intersection between SR 80 and US 27 and add an overpass was completed at the end of 2014.  SR 80 was widened from east of LaBelle to CR 833 west of Clewiston in 2020.  This widening eliminated the last two-lane undivided segment of SR 80, and it is now at least four lanes from Fort Myers to West Palm Beach.

Downtown Fort Myers alignment

State Road 80's routing through downtown Fort Myers has changed a few times over the years.  When designated in 1945, State Road 80 ran along First Street and terminated at Fowler Street.  At the time, US 41 (Tamiami Trail) ran through downtown Fort Myers on First Street west of Fowler Street and crossed the Caloosahatchee River on the original Edison Bridge.

SR 80 would be extended through downtown along First Street in 1964 when US 41 was rerouted over the Caloosahatchee Bridge near Carson Street on the west side of downtown (First Street also carried the US 41 Business Route concurrently west of Fowler Street at this time).

In the late 1980s, SR 80 was split into one-way street pairs from Monroe Street through downtown to Seaboard Street in East Fort Myers.  From Monroe Street, eastbound traffic ran along Second Street and Seaboard Street, where it reconnected to the westbound lanes at Palm Beach Boulevard.  Westbound traffic continued along Palm Beach Boulevard and First Street, and then shifted to Bay Street west of Fowler Street.  At Monroe Street, both directions rejoined along Main Street to connect to US 41.

SR 80 between Monroe and Fowler Streets was relinquished to the city of Fort Myers on January 11, 2006 as part of the downtown redevelopment and streetscape effort, which first created the gap in the route that exists today.  The city restored this segment of the streets to two-way traffic.  The segment of SR 80 east of Fowler Street to Allen Street (just east of Seaboard Street) remained one-way and under state control at this time.

SR 80 east of Fowler Street to Allen Street was relinquished to the city in August of 2018.  Though the state still maintains the historic Billy's Creek Lift Bridge.  The City of Fort Myers restored the remaining one-way segments of First, Second, and Seaboard Streets to two-way traffic in June of 2022.

Future
The two bridges crossing Lake Worth Lagoon, built in 1950, are currently undergoing replacement, with construction having begun in 2017. The main, bascule style drawbridge has been completely demolished and replaced with a temporary vertical lift bridge which opened in May 2018 and is expected to remain open until late 2020, when the permanent replacement bridge is expected to be completed. The tide-relief bridge is also now under replacement.

Major intersections

References

External links

Florida 80 (SouthEastRoads.com)

080
080
080
080
Transportation in Fort Myers, Florida